Pepsi is a soft drink. The name may also refer to:

 PepsiCo, its manufacturer
 Pepsi variations
 Pepsi Arena (disambiguation), various other entertainment venues
 Pepsi Center, in Denver, Colorado, U.S.
 Pepsi Center / Elitch Gardens (RTD), the associated light rail station
 Pepsi Centre, in Corner Brook, Newfoundland and Labrador, Canada
 Pepsi Globe, its logo
 Pepsi Orange Streak, a roller coaster sponsored by PepsiCo

Geography
 Pepsi Cola Lake, a lake in South Carolina

People
 Jacek Pszczoła (born 1967), Polish-American bridge player nicknamed "Pepsi"
 Pepsi Bethel (1918–2002), American dancer and choreographer
 Pepsi Tate  (1965–2007), Welsh musician
 René Landry (1937–2016), Canadian politician nicknamed "Pepsi"
 Saint Pepsi, former stage name of an American electronic music producer
 Marijuana Pepsi Vandyck, American educator
 Pepsi Paloma (1966–1985), Filipino dancer

Art, entertainment, and media

Games
 Pepsi Invaders, a 1983 video game

Music
 Pepsi & Shirlie, an English pop duo
 Pepsi Beats of the Beautiful Game, a 2014 compilation album
 Pepsi Music Festival, an Argentine music festival
 "Jack Pepsi", a song by Tad

Radio
 Pepsi Chart, a UK radio program

Television
 Pepsi Live, an Australian television program
 Pepsi Power Hour, a Canadian television program
 The Pepsi-Cola Playhouse, an American television program

Sports
 1996 Pepsi Sharjah Cup, a cricket tournament
 1997 Pepsi Independence Cup, a cricket tournament
 Pepsi 420, an automobile race
 Pepsi Championship, a golf tournament
 Pepsi Football Academy, a Nigerian football academy
 Pepsi Grand Slam, a tennis tournament
 Pepsi Little People's Golf Championships, a golf tournament
 Pepsi Max 400, an automobile race
 Pepsi NFL Rookie of the Week, an award
 Pepsi Ontario Junior Curling Championships, a curling tournament
 Juvecaserta Basket, an Italian basketball team also known as Pepsi Caserta
 Talk 'N Text Tropang Texters, a Philippine basketball team formerly known as the "Pepsi Hotshots" and the "Pepsi Mega Bottlers"
 Úrvalsdeild, an Icelandic football league also known as "Pepsi-deildin" ("the Pepsi League")

See also
 Dispepsi, an album by the band Negativland
 Dyspepsia, an alternate name for indigestion
 PEPPSI, a chemical
 Pepsis, a genus of tarantula hawk wasps
 Pluto Energetic Particle Spectrometer Science Investigation (PEPSSI), a spectrometry sensor on the New Horizons Pluto space probe
 Pepsin, a digestive enzyme